LaPlace is a census-designated place (CDP) in St. John the Baptist Parish, Louisiana, United States, situated along the east bank of the Mississippi River, in the New Orleans metropolitan area. In 2020, it had a population of 28,841.

LaPlace is the southern terminus of Interstate 55, where it joins with Interstate 10, and of US 51, where it terminates at the junction with US 61.

History

Pre-European
The Chitimacha lived in the region prior to the arrival of European colonists. The tribe’s lands once encompassed the entire Atchafalaya Basin, westward to Lafayette, southward to the Gulf of Mexico and eastward to the New Orleans area. The Chitimacha tribe currently resides on a reservation in St. Mary Parish.

European colonization 

Present-day LaPlace was settled by German immigrants in the early 18th century during Louisiana's French colonial period, as part of a larger settlement on the bank of the Mississippi called Karlstein. Karlstein was one of the four settlements collectively known as the "German Coast", having been populated by German-speaking immigrants since 1721. French and Acadians intermarried with the Germans, and the area came to be known as Bonnet Carré (French for "square bonnet"). The name Bonnet Carré was inspired by the right-angle turn of the Mississippi river near the settlement and its resemblance to a square bonnet.

1811 Slave Revolt
Manual Andry built Woodland plantation in 1793 and cultivated sugarcane. The crop was lucrative if brutal methods were used, as had been common in Haiti (and had led to a successful slave rebellion there). 

In early January 1811, slaves at Woodland Plantation and several nearby plantations attempted the German Coast Uprising. A group of 200-500 slaves armed with guns, axes, and cane knives set out from LaPlace to conquer New Orleans and gain freedom for themselves and others. Local white "militia" men crushed the rebellion within three days, and nearly 100 slaves were either killed in battle, slaughtered by pursuing militia, or executed after summary trials by planter tribunals. Although more slaves may have participated in the Black Seminole rebellion in 1836 and the whole of the Second Seminole War, this is now considered the largest slave rebellion.

Post-Civil War developments
In 1879, pharmacist, planter, and patent medicine purveyor Basile Laplace arrived from New Orleans and established a large plantation in Bonnet Carré. In 1883, he allowed the New Orleans and Baton Rouge Railroad to cut through his land. The settlement's railroad depot was named after Laplace, then the post office, and eventually the town itself.

In the 1920s, Woodland Plantation was bought by the Montegut family, but the most famous person born there may have been Kid Ory, who was born in an outbuilding and later led a successful New Orleans jazz band.

Weather events 

In the period between 1850 and 1883, the levee on the east bank of the Mississippi flooded several times. In 1850, a flood created the Bonnet Carré Crevasse, a levee breach that was more than a mile wide. Several major floods were exacerbated by this crevasse near LaPlace, and one resulted in severe flooding of New Orleans in 1871. The breach was closed in 1883.

In 1983, a violent F4 tornado devastated part of the town.

In 2012, about 5,000 houses were damaged by flooding in LaPlace during Hurricane Isaac.

In February 2016 and again in March 2016, several tornadoes touched down in LaPlace, damaging hundreds of buildings and disrupting power.

LaPlace was badly damaged by Hurricane Ida on August 29, 2021.

Spelling
Despite the spelling used for LaPlace's namesake, the St. John the Baptist Parish Police Jury decreed in 1971 that the official spelling of the town includes a capital letter "P".

Andouille 

Andouille, a smoked pork sausage that originated in France, is popular in LaPlace and elsewhere in Louisiana, but in the 1970s, then-Governor Edwin Edwards proclaimed LaPlace the "Official Andouille Capital of the World". Since 1972, LaPlace has held an Andouille Festival every October. On his program Feasting on Asphalt, TV chef Alton Brown visited LaPlace to sample its andouille.

Industry 
The Port of South Louisiana is headquartered in LaPlace. Other major employers in the region include Shell Chemical Company, DuPont, ADM Growmark, and ArcelorMittal (formerly Bayou Steel).

Geography

Demographics

At the 2010 United States census, there were 29,872 people, 11,159 households, and 10,592 families residing in the CDP. The racial makeup of the CDP was 47.0% White, 47.9% African American, 0.4% Native American, 1.0% Asian, 0.1% Pacific Islander, 1.11% from other races, and 1.17% from two or more races. The cultural groups for Hispanic or Latino, of any race, were 6.1% of the population. At the 2019 American Community Survey, there were 29,108 people living in the community, and 28,841 at the 2020 U.S. census. In 2019, the racial and ethnic makeup of LaPlace was 52.1% Black and African American, 41.4% non-Hispanic white, 1.6% Asian, 2.9% some other race, and 2.0% two or more races.

In 2010, there were 9,171 households, out of which 44.9% had children under the age of 18 living with them, 60.4% were married couples living together, 14.9% had a female householder with no husband present, and 20.0% were non-families. 16.4% of all households were made up of individuals, and 4.9% had someone living alone who was 65 years of age or older. The average household size was 2.97 and the average family size was 3.34.

In the CDP, the population was spread out, with 31.2% under the age of 18, 9.4% from 18 to 24, 31.6% from 25 to 44, 21.3% from 45 to 64, and 6.5% who were 65 years of age or older. The median age was 32 years. For every 100 females, there were 96.6 males. For every 100 females age 18 and over, there were 93.8 males. In 2019, the median age was 36.3.

The median income for a household in the CDP was $45,103, and the median income for a family was $50,024 at the 2010 U.S. census. Males had a median income of $39,304 versus $23,277 for females. The per capita income for the CDP was $17,090. About 9.9% of families and 12.1% of the population were below the poverty line, including 15.4% of those under age 18 and 13.0% of those age 65 or over. In 2019, the median household income increased to $53,253 and the poverty rate was 15.3%.

Education

Public schools
The St. John the Baptist Parish School Board operates public schools in LaPlace.
 St. John STEM Magnet Program
 East St. John Elementary School
 Emily C Watkins Elementary School
 Glade Elementary School
 John L. Ory Communications Magnet Elementary School
 Laplace Elementary School
 St. John Special Education
 Lake Pontchartrain Elementary School

Private and parochial schools
 Ascension of Our Lord School
 Liberty Christian Academy
 Riverside Academy
 Saint Charles Catholic High School
 St. Joan of Arc Catholic School

List of movie and television appearances
 The Academy Award-winning movie Monster's Ball, starring Halle Berry and Billy Bob Thornton.
 The television series Memphis Beat.
 Various scenes of the WWE Studios movie Knucklehead.
 The Old Airline Motors Diner on Airline Highway in LaPlace doubled as an IHOP in the movie Glory Road.
 The Jonas Brothers music video "Pom Poms" featured the Joe Keller Memorial Stadium in nearby Reserve, Louisiana.

Notable people
*

 Jared Butler, basketball player for Baylor University
 A. J. Duhe, Louisiana State University alumnus, former linebacker for the Miami Dolphins
 Robert Faucheux, attorney and state representative from 1996 to 2004 
 Randal Gaines, attorney and Louisiana State Representative for St. Charles and St. John the Baptist parishes since 2012
 Louis Lipps, former wide receiver for the Pittsburgh Steelers and the New Orleans Saints
 Chris Markey, former running back for the UCLA Bruins
 Damon Mason, defensive back and coach in the Arena Football League
 Nickie Monica, businessman, former parish president and former state representative
 Edward "Kid" Ory, trombonist and bandleader
 DeQuincy Scott, football player
 Ian Villafana, guitarist

Media 
Cable and Internet services in LaPlace are provided by Reserve Telecommunications.

See also

 Reserve, Louisiana
 Lake Pontchartrain
 Bonnet Carré Spillway
 Hurricane Katrina
 River Road, Louisiana

References

Census-designated places in Louisiana
Census-designated places in St. John the Baptist Parish, Louisiana
Census-designated places in New Orleans metropolitan area
Louisiana populated places on the Mississippi River